The death of Bridget Driscoll (c. 185117 August 1896) was the first recorded case of a pedestrian killed in a collision with a motor car in Great Britain. Driscoll, in the company of her teenage daughter May and her friend Elizabeth Murphy, was crossing Dolphin Terrace in the grounds of the Crystal Palace in London when she was struck by a car belonging to the Anglo-French Motor Carriage Company that was being used to give demonstration rides. One witness described the car as travelling at "a reckless pace, in fact, like a fire engine".

His passenger, Alice Standing of Forest Hill, alleged he modified the engine to allow the car to go faster, but another taxicab driver examined the car and said it was incapable of exceeding  because of a low-speed engine belt.
    
The jury returned a verdict of "accidental death" after an inquest lasting some six hours. The coroner, Percy Morrison (Croydon division of Surrey), said he hoped "such a thing would never happen again". The Royal Society for the Prevention of Accidents estimated 550,000 people had been killed on UK roads by 2010.

See also
Mary Ward, (1827–1869) Anglo-Irish scientist, first motor vehicle fatality in the world
Henry H. Bliss, (1830–1899) first motor vehicle fatality in the Americas
Harrow on the Hill, location of the first motor car driver fatality in Great Britain
Elaine Herzberg, first pedestrian killed by an autonomous motor car

References

External links
History of Road Safety

1851 births
1896 deaths
Accidental deaths in England
Deaths by person in London
19th-century Irish people
19th-century Irish women
Pedestrian road incident deaths
Road incident deaths in London